Farnsley can refer to:
Charles R. Farnsley (1907-1990), mayor of Louisville, Kentucky
Riverside, The Farnsley-Moremen Landing, a historic property in Louisville